The City of Children (translit. I poli ton paidion) is a 2011 Greek drama film directed by Giorgos Gikapeppas.

Cast
 Kika Georgiou as Nadine
 Giorgos Ziovas as Antonis
 Vassilis Bisbikis as Fotis
 Anna Kalaitzidou as Dina
 Iosif Polyzoidis as Nadine's Neighbor
 Dimitris Kotzias as Tasos
 Natalia Kalimeratzi as Liza
 Maria Tsima as Vaso
 Iro Loupi as Marina
 Leonidas Kakouris as Spyros
 Mihalis Sarantis as Giannis

References

External links
 

2011 films
2011 drama films
Greek drama films
2010s Greek-language films